Chandra Mohan Singh Negi  was an Indian politician and a member of the 8th Lok Sabha and 9th Lok Sabha. He represented the Garhwal Lok Sabha Constituency and was a member of the Congress political party. He was also elected to the 5th and 8th Uttar Pradesh Assembly from Lansdowne Assembly constituency. He served as a minister in Chandra Bhanu Gupta, V. P. Singh and Sripati Mishra Cabinet.
Has a close relation with Shri Surender Singh Negi and Shri Girdhari Lal Amoli.
Girdhari Lal Amoli was The varisth zila upadhyaks From congress party and editor of Dainik Parvtiy.

Positions held

References

1939 births
Possibly living people
Indian National Congress politicians from Uttar Pradesh
People from Pauri Garhwal district
India MPs 1984–1989
India MPs 1989–1991
Lok Sabha members from Uttar Pradesh
Living people